The Via Mare is a ro-pax ship which is owned and operated by Baltic Scandinavian Lines.

History
The Via Mare was launched for Townsend Thoresen as the European Clearway in 1976 for use on their Dover – Zeebrugge route. Townsend Thoresen was absorbed by P&O European Ferries in 1987, retaining the European Clearway before transferring it to Pandoro, another section of P&O. In 1992 European Clearway was transferred to the Portsmouth – Le Havre route In 1993 she was transferred to the Rosslare – Cherbourg route. In 1996 Pandoro renamed the ship Panther, in keeping with the animal names of the other ships in their fleet. Two years later the name was changed again, this time to European Pathfinder when Pandoro Ltd. merged with P&O European (Felixstowe) Ltd. to form P&O European Ferries (Irish Sea).

The vessel suffered a serious fire on 26 November 1997 when 35 miles out from Rosslare on passage to Cherbourg, but was repaired at Birkenhead and returned to service.

She was transferred to the Larne-Cairnryan route in April 2001 to replace the European Trader which had been sold. Unfortunately her port main engine failed in June 2002 and was not repaired, resulting in the final month of operation being at 10 kt on one engine. She was laid up in Liverpool in July 2002 and spent several months awaiting a buyer. In October 2002 the vessel was briefly owned by Erato Shipping of Greece and renamed Regina I but was very quickly sold to Transeuropa Ferries for use on their Ramsgate Ostend service, being renamed Begonia. Her first voyage from Ostend to Ramsgate was on 11 February 2004, following a refit which took over a year. On 8 July 2005 she was sold to Baltic Scandinavian Lines for use on their Kapellskär – Paldiski route.

Sister ships
M/F Gardenia – originally European Enterprise
Lina Trader – originally European Trader
Penelope – originally European Gateway (laid down as European Express)

References

1975 ships